Exfoliatin is a Staphylococcus aureus exotoxin that causes a blistering of the skin known as staphylococcal scalded skin syndrome, usually in infants.

Exfoliatins are glutamate-specific serine proteases highly specific to desmoglein I, a cadherin (adhesion protein) in the desmosomes of the stratum granulosum that facilitates intercellular adhesion between keratinocytes. The resulting vesicle is an intraepidermal cleft located above the basal cells (suprabasal), between the stratum corneum and stratum spinosum.  A very similar non-infectious condition is seen in the autoimmune skin disorder pemphigus vulgaris in which there is an IgG antibody against the cadherin desmoglein 3.

See also
 Exfoliation (disambiguation)
 Staphylococcus aureus — Exfoliative toxins

References

Staphylococcaceae
Bacterial toxins